Miami Garden Club is the debut studio album by American hip hop artist Kitty, released on August 25, 2017. The album was crowdfunded through a campaign on the website Kickstarter.

Background and production 
In 2015, Kitty began working on the album with big-name producers in Los Angeles, but was unhappy with the results. This, along with her feeling bored of following a routine, lead her to decide to produce the album independently. Kitty studied music theory and learned to use the software Ableton in preparation for making the album. Miami Garden Club is the first release by Kitty to feature tracks produced or co-produced by Kitty herself.

On August 11, 2015, Kitty launched a campaign on Kickstarter to fund her debut album. The first goal of $25,000, which would fund the making of the album itself, was achieved in 30 hours. The goal was then stretched to $50,000, to fund a headlining tour. By the end of the one-month campaign, Kitty raised $51,863 from 1,164 backers.

The release was originally expected for January 2016, but the album's completion was delayed for various reasons. Kitty has mentioned working with an unnamed producer, and having to discard the songs they made together when their professional relationship broke down. In December 2015, Kitty stated that the album was "taking longer than expected"; citing illness and perfectionism as reasons. Much of the album was scrapped and rewritten because, according to Kitty, "I didn't like [the songs] and wanted to be able to be 100% proud of my work." On January 9, 2016, Kitty revealed that her suitcase had been stolen from LAX. She lost notebooks containing 2–3 years worth of lyrics, including lyrics for the album which she "was entirely proud of and intended on using"; and an external hard drive holding the first draft of the album. Kitty spent time in 2016 focusing on her mental health before restarting work on the album for the third time On April 1, 2017, Kitty announced that the album was complete.

Miami Garden Club is influenced by "‘80s and ‘90s pop music". It marks a shift from Kitty's previous hip-hop sound—a change which Kitty has attributed to her being "sick of rapping".

Release and promotion 
On October 12, 2016, the track "Asari Love Song" was released as part of the Adult Swim Singles Program 2016, and as the first single from Miami Garden Club.

Upon announcing the completion of the album on April 1, 2017, Kitty shared the cover art via Kickstarter. The artwork was designed by Kitty and drawn by Alé Garza.

On July 28, the album was made available to pre-order, the title track was released as a promotional single, and the music video for the title track was released. The video was directed and produced by Kitty and Sam Ray.

Miami Garden Club was self-released on Kitty's own label Pretty Wavvy on August 25, 2017. It was released digitally, on CD, and on limited deep pink vinyl.

On September 17, 2017, the music video for "Mass Text Booty Call" premiered on YouTube, along with a live streamed show featuring performances by Kitty and other musicians.

Track listing 

Notes
On physical releases, track 6 is printed as "Song for Sunset Ave (Running Away)", and track 7 is printed as "If You Wanna Come Over".
On Bandcamp, the intro to "Mass Text Booty Call" was released as a separate track, titled "Mass Text Booty Call-in".
"Mass Text Booty Call" is a reworking of a 2014 solo track by Sprightly.
"Brush Me Off" is a reworking of a 2014 track by Pat Lukens, which featured vocals from Kitty and rapper Sad Andy. Sad Andy's verse is replaced by an entirely new verse by DVS.

References 

2017 albums
Kitty (rapper) albums